The London Motor Museum had more than 160 exhibits; they included classic cars from the 1960s, 1970s and 1980s, and a selection of famous cars – including Herbie the Volkswagen Beetle, one of six original Batmobiles used in the first Batman (1989) film, and a Ford Gran Torino from the television series Starsky & Hutch.  The museum closed down permanently in June 2018 after a dispute with the local council over business rates. The vehicles have now been moved to other museums across the UK.

Management
The museum's founder, known as Elo King, a former model, drove with Maximillion Cooper in the first Gumball 3000 rally in 1999.

Gallery

References

External links
 
 London Motor Museum - official website

Automobile museums in England
Transport museums in London
Museums in the London Borough of Hillingdon
Museums established in 2012
2012 establishments in England